Jack "The Lad" Kavanagh (born 1988 in Bahana, County Carlow) is an Irish sportsperson. He plays hurling with his local club St Mullin's and has been a member of the senior Carlow county hurling team since 2011.

References

1988 births
Living people
Carlow inter-county hurlers
St Mullin's hurlers